Jorge Gamboa was a Chilean cyclist. He competed in the team pursuit event at the 1928 Summer Olympics.

References

External links
 

Year of birth missing
Possibly living people
Chilean male cyclists
Olympic cyclists of Chile
Cyclists at the 1928 Summer Olympics
Place of birth missing
20th-century Chilean people